Abbie Park Ferguson (April 4, 1837, Whately, Massachusetts  - March 25, 1919 Cape Town, South Africa) was  founder and president of Huguenot Seminary (later Huguenot College).

Education

She graduated from Mount Holyoke College (then Mount Holyoke Female Seminary) in 1856. She taught in Niles, Michigan until 1858 and later in New Haven, Connecticut from 1867 until 1873.In 1869, she accompanied two female students to chaperone them in their studies abroad in Europe. While abroad, Park Ferguson and the girls were detained from their travels when war broke out. They had to wait for peace to be brokered before continuing their travels.

Huguenot Seminary

In 1873 Ferguson and another Mount Holyoke graduate (1862), Anna Bliss, moved to Cape Town, South Africa and established the first women's college in the region, Huguenot Seminary in 1874. She took a leave of absence from 1905 to 1906 during which time she received an M.A. from Mount Holyoke. In 1912, Mount Holyoke honoured her in absentia with a Doctor of Letters.  The seminary school was established as an official college in 1898. She was the first president of the seminary school and continued her presidency until her retirement in 1910. She died nine years later at the age of 82 while still living in South Africa.

References

1.     Page 34 Ferguson, Arthur B. Genealogy of the descendants of John Ferguson: a native of Scotland, who emigrated to America before the Revolutionary War. Salem MA: Newcomb & Gauss, 1911. https://babel.hathitrust.org/cgi/pt?id=wu.89066139429&view=1up&seq=7.

2.    Page 126 Mount Holyoke College: The Seventy-fifth Anniversary, South Hadley, Mass., October 8 and 9, 1912. United States: Springfield Printing and Binding Company, 1913.

3.     Rolle, Elisa. Queer Places. Accessed November 8, 2020. http://www.elisarolle.com/queerplaces/abcde/Abbie%20Park%20Ferguson.html.

External links
Mount Holyoke College Biographical Directory
 Ferguson Papers, 1861-1919
Huguenot Seminary Papers, 1874-1978

1837 births
1919 deaths
Mount Holyoke College alumni
People from Franklin County, Massachusetts
Women heads of universities and colleges
Heads of universities and colleges in South Africa
American emigrants to South Africa
Founders of educational institutions